Nasipit, officially the Municipality of Nasipit, is a 3rd class municipality in the province of Agusan del Norte, Philippines. According to the 2020 census, it has a population of 44,822 people.

The Port of Nasipit is the major seaport or base port in Agusan del Norte. The Philippine Ports Authority (PPA) assigned PMO Nasipit as an International Base port.

History
Perched on a promontory overlooking the picturesque Nasipit Bay is the progressive industrial town of Nasipit. From the open sea, approaching the town one would readily notice that pall of heavy smoke emanating from giant smoke-stacks, evidence of industrial activity within the sprawling compound of the Nasipit Lumber Company and the Philippine Wallboard Corporation.

The shoreline of Nasipit assumes a claw-like from which “Nasip-it” was derived. Until 1929, Nasipit was a barrio of Butuan. The then Governor Guingona proposed to change the name Nasipit to “Aurora”. Due to the strong opposition of the early inhabitants, however, the word Na-si-pit was retained.

Little is known about historical events that took place in this town during its early days. But legend has it that three women were abducted by marauding Moro pirates who occasionally came to this place to rob and plunder. It was said that the villagers were terrified whenever the pirates came ashore and they went into hiding for days atop the thickly-forested hill which they later on settled and developed as the present-day Poblacion. Because of this danger, the early settlers constructed a watchtower at the site presently occupied by the Catholic Church, to watch out for and warn the people of an impending pirate raid.

The earliest settlers of this town were immigrants from Cebu, Leyte and the different parts of the archipelago threaded their way into this town to settle permanently.

The administration of the late Mayor Catalino Atupan saw the beginnings of industrial activities in this once sleepy town. During his nine years in office, Mayor Atupan strove to increase tax collection and encouraged the establishment of factories on account of the town’s strategic geographical location and ideal shipping facilities. At the end of his term in 1946, the Nasipit Lumber Company Incorporated, controlled and operated by the Fernandez Hermanos started its operation. Thus, began Nasipit’s march to progress.

Nasipit was officially separated from the municipality of Butuan on August 1, 1929. It became a municipality by virtue of Executive Order No. 181 issued by Acting Governor General of the Philippines Eugene Allen Gilmore. A proposal to change its name to Aurora was initiated by then Governor Teofisto Guingona Sr., but due to the strong opposition from townsfolk, the name Nasipit was retained.

Geography
According to the Philippine Statistics Authority, the municipality has a land area of  constituting  of the  total area of Agusan del Norte.

Nasipit occupies the north-western portion of the province. It is bounded in the east and south by Buenavista, west by Carmen, and north by the Butuan Bay. The town is accessible by sea through the inter-island vessels docking in the Nasipit International Seaport, to destinations such as Manila, Cebu, Bohol, and Cagayan de Oro.

Climate

Barangays
Nasipit is politically subdivided into 19 barangays. Of these, 5 are urban and 14 are rural. Of the 19 barangays, 9 are coastal: Cubi–Cubi, Ata–Atahon, Punta, Barangay 1 Apagan (Poblacion), Talisay (home to the Port of Nasipit), Santa Ana, Camagong, Amontay and Aclan.

Demographics

In the 2020 census, Nasipit had a population of 44,822.

Economy

Nasipit was identified by the Caraga Regional Development Council (Caraga RDC) through Resolution Number 44 Series of 1996, as the Regional Agri-Industrial Growth Center (RAGC) of the Caraga Region. The municipality's identification as the RAGC and its inclusion in the Agusan Norte Special Economic Zone (ANSEZ) can be attributed to the establishment of the Nasipit Agusan del Norte Industrial Estate (NANIE).

Tourism

Town fiesta
Nasipit celebrates its annual fiesta every 29 September in honor to the town's patron saint, St. Michael, the Archangel, which includes thanksgiving mass and parade before the day of fiesta activities.

Araw ng Nasipit
Araw ng Nasipit (Day of Nasipit) - the day commemorating the townhood anniversary of Nasipit from 1929 after it was a barrio of Butuan

Saint Michael the Archangel Parish Church
Located at the heart of the town, it was built by MSC or Dutch priests during the 1960s. Recently, the altar of the church was constructed on its new image.

Infrastructure

Communications
The Philippine Long Distance Telephone Company provides fixed line services. Wireless mobile communications services are provided by Smart Communications and Globe Telecommunications.

Transportation
Nasipit can be accessed through the Mindanao Pan-Philippine Highway.

Air
 Bancasi Airport of Butuan
 Laguindingan Airport of Cagayan de Oro

PAL and Cebu Pacific have daily flights from Manila to Butuan and vice versa.

Sea
Through the Port of Nasipit, there are several major shipping lines serving the Manila and Cebu routes: 2GO Travel, Carlos A. Gothong Shipping Lines, Philippine Span Asia Carrier Corporation aka Sulpicio Lines, Cokaliong Shipping Lines Inc., and Trans-Asia Shipping Lines. The Philippine Coast Guard — CG Detachment Nasipit is located at the Port of Nasipit near the Nasipit SeaPort Terminal.

Land
Nasipit can be reached by riding jeepney, van, multicabs and buses from Butuan in 45 minutes, and 4 hours to 5 hours by bus from Cagayan de Oro. The public mode of transportation in Nasipit is by tricycle similar in Butuan.

Education

Elementary schools

 Aclan Elementary School
 Amontay Elementary School
 Ata-Atahon Elementary School
 Camagong Elementary School
 Cubi-Cubi Elementary School
 Culit Elementary School
 Jaguimitan Elementary School
 Kinabjangan Central Elementary School - East Central
 Nasipit Central Elementary School - West Central
 Northwestern Agusan Colleges
 Punta Elementary School
 Saint Michael College of Caraga
 Santa Ana Elementary School
 Talisay Elementary School
 Triangulo Elementary School

High schools and colleges

 Saint Michael College of Caraga
 Ata-atahon National High School
 Culit National High School
 Jaguimitan National High School
 Nasipit National High School (NNHS/IS)
 Nasipit National Vocational School
 Northwestern Agusan Colleges
 Pacifican Institute of Agusan
 Saint Joseph Institute of Technology - Cubi-Cubi Campus

Notable personalities

Sylvia Sanchez

References

External links

 [ Philippine Standard Geographic Code]
 Nasipit official Website
 VisitNasipit.com

Municipalities of Agusan del Norte
Populated places established in 1929
Port cities and towns in the Philippines